Anderson Creek Township is one of thirteen townships in Harnett County, North Carolina, United States. The township had a population of 11,216 according to the 2000 census. It is a part of the Dunn Micropolitan Area, which is also a part of the greater Raleigh–Durham–Cary Combined Statistical Area (CSA) as defined by the United States Census Bureau.

Geographically, Anderson Creek Township occupies  in southern Harnett County.  There are no incorporated municipalities located in Anderson Creek Township, however, there are several unincorporated communities located here, including the community of Anderson Creek.

References

Townships in Harnett County, North Carolina
Townships in North Carolina